Brotas is a neighborhood located in the western zone of Salvador, Bahia. When Nordeste Linhas Aéreas Regionais existed, its headquarters were in Brotas.

References

Neighbourhoods in Salvador, Bahia